The Church Association was an English evangelical Anglican organisation founded in 1865. It was particularly active in opposition to Anglo-Catholicism, ritualism, and the Oxford Movement. Founded in 1865 by Richard P. Blakeney, the association stated in its first annual report that the objectives of the association were, "To uphold the principles and order of the United Church of England and Ireland, and to counteract the efforts now being made to assimilate her services to those of the Church of Rome."

As well as publishing information (including its Church Association Tracts) and holding public meetings, controversially, this also involved instigating legal action against Anglo-Catholics under the Public Worship Regulation Act 1874; for instance, legal action was taken against Sidney Faithorn Green and Richard William Enraght. According to the association this was intended to clarify the law, however the ritualists refusal to comply with the courts verdicts coupled with the bishops unwillingness to act eventually led to such legal action not being pursued.

In 1950, the association merged with the National Church League to form the Church Society.

References

External links
Church Association Tracts
The Teaching of the Ritualists not the Teaching of the Church of England, Church Association Tract 4, John Charles Ryle

Anglican organizations
History of the Church of England
Religious organizations established in 1865